Kenneth Brower  is an American writer known for his natural environment writings. His published works include articles with the National Geographic Society, The Atlantic Monthly, Smithsonian, Audubon, and several other periodicals.

Brower has written for the National Geographic Society. Published articles have appeared in National Geographic, National Geographic Books, National Geographic Traveler, National Geographic History & Culture (online) and National Geographic Adventure. He has also published articles with The Atlantic (Formerly  known as The Atlantic Monthly).

Brower is the author of several books about environmental issues and natural history. His publications include The Starship and the Canoe about the physicist Freeman Dyson and  his son George Dyson; Freeing Keiko: The Journey of a Killer Whale from Free Willy to the Wild, about the Orca, Keiko, made famous by the motion picture Free Willy; And his book Yosemite: An American Treasure is in over 1,200 WorldCat libraries.

Brower is the oldest son of David Brower, who was a prominent environmentalist and the founder of many environmental organizations. His first job was working as an editor for the Exhibit Format series, published by Sierra Club Books. He also was a contributing author and editor for The Earth's Wild Places series.

Brower's career spans decades, this is list of his published works.

Bibliography

The Earth's Wild Places series

Exhibit Format series
All books in this series were published by Sierra Club Books

References

External links

20th-century male writers
American non-fiction environmental writers